Weston Woods Studios (or simply Weston Woods) is a production company that makes audio and short films based on well-known books for children.
It was founded in 1953 by Morton Schindel in Weston, Connecticut, and named after the wooded area near his home. Weston Wood studio's first project was Andy and the Lion in 1954, and its first animated film was The Snowy Day in 1964. In 1968, Weston Woods began a long collaboration with animator Gene Deitch. Later, they opened international offices in Henley-on-Thames, England, UK (1972), as well as in Canada (1975), and in Australia (1977). In addition to making the films, weston woods also conducted interviews with the writers, illustrators, and makers of the films. The films have appeared on children's television programs such as Captain Kangaroo, Eureeka's Castle, and Sammy's Story Shop. In the mid-1980s, the films were released on VHS under the Children's Circle titles, and Wood Knapp Video distributed these releases from 1988 to 1995.

Beginning in 1968, Weston Woods also made filmstrips and audio recordings synchronized to them, which became known as the Picture Book Parade. Many of these recordings were narrated by actor Owen Jordan and were often different or expanded recordings from the films.

In 1996, Weston Woods was acquired by Scholastic Corporation.

Selected filmography
 1955 – Andy and the Lion
 1955 – Make Way for Ducklings
 1955 – The Red Carpet
 1955 – Stone Soup
 1955 – Millions of Cats
 1955 – The Story About Ping
 1956 – Georgie
 1956 – The Circus Baby
 1956 - Jenny's Birthday Book
 1956 – The Little Red Lighthouse and the Great Gray Bridge
 1956 - Mike Mulligan and His Steam Shovel
 1958 – Lentil 1958 – The Camel Who Took a Walk 1958 – Curious George Rides a Bike 1958 – The Five Chinese Brothers 1959 – Harold and the Purple Crayon 1959 – Madeline's Rescue 1959 – Madeline and the Bad Hat 1959 – Madeline and the Gypsies 1960 – Caps for Sale 1960 – The Stonecutter 1961 – Time of Wonder 1964 – Lively Art of Picture Books 1964 – Robert McClosky<ref>{{Cite web |url=http://www.movierevie.ws/movies/35590/Robert-McCloskey.html |title=DVD Movie Reviews: Robert McCloskey |access-date=2008-05-11 |archive-url=https://archive.today/20120907215657/http://www.movierevie.ws/movies/35590/Robert-McCloskey.html |archive-date=2012-09-07 |url-status=dead }}</ref>
 1964 – The Snowy Day
 1964 – Whistle for Willie
 1965 – The Tale of Custard the Dragon (spoofed by RiffTrax)
 1966 – Maurice Sendak
 1967 – Blueberries for Sal
 1969 – Drummer Hoff
 1969 – The Happy Owls
 1970 – Hush, Little Baby
 1970 – Rosie's Walk
 1970 – The Cow Who Fell in the Canal
 1970 – A Letter to Amy
 1970 - The Fisherman and His Wife
 1971 – The Twelve Days of Christmas
 1971 – A Picture for Harold's Room
 1971 – In a Spring Garden
 1971 – The Foolish Frog
 1971 – Peter's Chair
 1971 – Wynken, Blynken and Nod
 1971 – The Owl and the Pussycat
 1971 – Petunia
 1971 – Norman the Doorman
 1972 – The Three Robbers
 1972 – Changes, Changes
 1973 – A Story, A Story
 1973 – Patrick
 1974 – The Beast of Monsieur Racine 
 1974 – Tikki Tikki Tembo
 1974 – Anansi the Spider
 1974 – Goggles!
 1974 – Harold's Fairy Tale
 1975; 1988 – Where the Wild Things Are
 1976 – Really Rosie
 1976 – How a Picture Book is Made
 1976 – Little Tim and the Brave Sea Captain
 1977 – Strega Nona
 1977 – Apt. 3
 1977 – Charlie Needs a Cloak
 1977 – Gene Deitch: The Picture Book Animated 
 1978 – The Rainbow Serpent
 1978 – Smile for Auntie 
 1979 – Suho and the White Horse
 1980 – Teeny-Tiny and the Witch-Woman
 1981 – Moon Man
 1981 – The Trip
 1981 – Morton Schindel: From Page to Screen
 1982 – Fourteen Rats and a Rat-Catcher
 1982 – John Brown, Rose and the Midnight Cat
 1982 – The Hat
 1982 – The Clown of God
 1982 – The Tomten
 1982 – Morris's Disappearing Bag
 1983 – Burt Dow: Deep-Water Man
 1983 – A Dark, Dark Tale
 1984 – Corduroy
 1984 – King of the Cats
 1984 – Why Mosquitoes Buzz in People's Ears
 1984 – Doctor DeSoto (Academy Award for Best Animated Short Film nominee) 
 1985 – Happy Birthday, Moon
 1985 – The Napping House
 1985 – The Amazing Bone
 1985 – The Wizard
 1986 – Sendak
 1986 – The Mysterious Tadpole
 1986 – The Village of Round and Square Houses
 1986 – The Most Wonderful Egg in the World
 1986 – Frederick
 1986 – Cornelius
 1986 – Fish is Fish
 1986 – It's Mine!
 1986 – Swimmy
 1987 – In the Night Kitchen
 1987 – Jonah and the Great Fish
 1988 – Joey Runs Away
 1988 – The Caterpillar and the Polliwog
 1988 – Stanley and the Dinosaurs
 1988 – Max's Christmas
 1988 – The Three Little Pigs (with Erik Blegvad illustrations)
 1989 – Brave Irene
 1989 – The Story of the Dancing Frog
 1989 – What's Under My Bed?
 1989 – Mufaro's Beautiful Daughters
 1989 - Hot Hippo
 1989 - Owl Moon
 1990 – The Happy Lion
 1990 – The Emperor's New Clothes
 1990 – The Pigs' Wedding
 1990 – Danny and the Dinosaur
 1991 – Flossie & the Fox
 1991 – Max's Chocolate Chicken
 1991 – The Three Little Pigs
 1991 – Wings: A Tale of Two Chickens
 1991 – The Selkie Girl
 1991 – The Little Red Hen
 1991 – The Three Billy Goats Gruff
 1991 – The Sad Story of Veronica Who Played the Violin
 1992 – Red Riding Hood
 1992 – Not So Fast, Songololo
 1992 – Pet Show!
 1992 – The Day Jimmy's Boa Ate the Wash
 1992 – Here Comes the Cat!
 1992 – Each Peach, Pear, Plum
 1992 – Monty
 1992 – The Great White Man-Eating Shark
 1993 – Goldilocks and the Three Bears
 1993 – Musical Max
 1993 – Sylvester and the Magic Pebble
 1993 - Princess Furball
 1994 – Amazing Grace
 1994 – In the Month of Kislev
 1994 – The Three-Legged Cat
 1994 – Noisy Nora
 1994 – Cat and Canary
 1995 – Owen
 1995 – Who's In Rabbit's House?
 1997 – Harry the Dirty Dog
 1997 – All the Colors of the Earth
 1997 – And Then What Happened, Paul Revere?
 1997 – By the Light of the Halloween Moon
 1997 – Seven Candles for Kwanzaa
 1997 – Officer Buckle and Gloria
 1998 – A Weekend With Wendell
 1998 – Angus and the Ducks
 1998 – Chicken Little
 1998 – Good Night, Gorilla
 1998 - Wilfrid Gordon McDonald Partridge
 1998 – One Zillion Valentines
 1998 – John Henry
 1998 – The Night Before Christmas
 1998 – The Tale of the Mandarin Ducks
 1999 – Chrysanthemum
 1999 – Chicka Chicka Boom Boom 
 1999 – Zin! Zin! Zin! A Violin!
 1999 – This Land is Your Land
 1999 – Leo the Late Bloomer
 1999 – Miss Nelson Is Back
 1999 – Miss Nelson Has a Field Day
 1999 – Sam and the Lucky Money
 1999 – Shrinking Violet
 1999 – Chato's Kitchen
 2000 – Antarctic Antics
 2000 – Space Case
 2000 – How Much is a Million?
 2000 – Miss Rumphius
 2000 – Pete's a Pizza
 2000 – The Island of the Skog
 2000 – The Scrambled States of America
 2000 - Duke Ellington: The Piano Prince and His Orchestra
 2000 – The Paperboy
 2000 – Elizabeti's Doll
 2000 – Johnny Appleseed
 2001 – Three Cheers for Catherine the Great!
 2001 – In the Small, Small Pond
 2001 – Click, Clack, Moo: Cows That Type
 2001 – Trashy Town
 2001 - Possum Magic
 2001 – Joseph Had a Little Overcoat
 2001 – The Ugly Duckling
 2001 – Henry Hikes to Fitchburg
 2002 - Too Many Tamales
 2002 – There Was An Old Lady Who Swallowed A Fly
 2002 – Waiting for Wings
 2002 – Goose
 2002 – How Do Dinosaurs Say Good Night?
 2002 – If You Made a Million
 2002 – I, Crocodile
 2002 – The Nutshell Kids Library (aka Really Rosie DVD version)
 2002 – Five Creatures
 2002 – Martin's Big Words
 2002 – Merry Christmas, Space Case
 2003 – Dem Bones
 2003 – Bark, George
 2003 – Come On, Rain!
 2003 – Chato and the Party Animals
 2003 – Is Your Mama a Llama?
 2003 – Giggle, Giggle, Quack
 2003 – Dot the Fire Dog
 2003 – The Teacher From the Black Lagoon
 2003 – Ella Fitzgerald: The Tale of a Vocal Virtuosa
 2003 – Snowflake Bentley
 2003 – Henry Builds a Cabin
 2004 – Chicka Chicka 1, 2, 3
 2004 – Duck for President
 2004 – I Lost My Bear
 2004 – Over in the Meadow
 2004 – The Dot
 2004 – This Is The House That Jack Built
 2004 – The Wheels on the Bus
 2004 – Will I Have a Friend?
 2004 – No Roses for Harry!
 2004 – The Pot That Juan Built
 2004 – The Elves and the Shoemaker
 2005 – Arnie the Doughnut
 2005 – Roberto the Insect Architect
 2005 – Bear Snores On
 2005 – Diary of a Worm
 2005 – How Do Dinosaurs Get Well Soon?
 2005 – Planting A Rainbow
 2005 - Ellington Was Not a Street
 2005 – Stars! Stars! Stars!
 2005 – The Man Who Walked Between the Towers
 2005 – T is for Terrible
 2005 – Wild About Books
 2005 – Hansel and Gretel
 2006 – Dinosaur Bones
 2006 – James Marshall's Cinderella
 2006 – Diary of a Spider
 2006 – Bear Wants More
 2006 – He's Got the Whole World in His Hands
 2006 – Knuffle Bunny: A Cautionary Tale
 2006 – Inch by Inch
 2006 – Hondo and Fabian
 2006 – Lon Po Po
 2006 - That New Animal
 2006 – Emily's First 100 Days of School
 2006 – Reading To Your Bunny
 2006 – Giraffes Can't Dance
 2007 – Dooby Dooby Moo
 2007 – John, Paul, George and Ben
 2007 – Wallace's Lists
 2007 – A Very Brave Witch
 2007 – Seven Blind Mice
 2007 – Max's Words
 2007 – Leonardo, the Terrible Monster
 2007 – Open Wide: Tooth School Inside
 2007 – The Librarian From the Black Lagoon
 2007 - Rosa
 2008 – Bugs! Bugs! Bugs!
 2008 – Otto Runs for President
 2008 – Do Unto Otters
 2008 – Madam President
 2008 – Grandfather's Journey
 2008 – The True Story of the 3 Little Pigs
 2008 – Great Joy
 2008 – Diary of a Fly
 2008 – What Do You Do With a Tail Like This?
 2009 – Crazy Hair Day
 2009 – Los Gatos Black on Halloween
 2009 – Duck on a Bike
 2009 – Henry's Freedom Box
 2009 – Don't Let the Pigeon Drive the Bus!
 2009 – Knuffle Bunny Too: A Case of Mistaken Identity
 2009 – The Gym Teacher From the Black Lagoon
 2009 – The Scrambled States of America Talent Show
 2009 – Lincoln and Douglass: An American Friendship
 2009 – There's Something in My Attic
 2009 – Little Quack
 2009 – Goodnight Moon
 2010 – Spoon
 2010 – The Dinosaurs of Waterhouse Hawkins
 2010 – Naked Mole Rat Gets Dressed
 2010 – The Curious Garden
 2010 – Splat the Cat
 2010 – The Doughnuts
 2010 – The Pigeon Finds A Hot Dog!
 2010 – Five Little Monkeys Jumping on the Bed
 2010 – Blue Burt and Wiggles
 2010 – Big Al
 2011 – All the World
 2011 – Children Make Terrible Pets!
 2011 – Gladys Goes Out to Lunch
 2011 – Don't Let the Pigeon Stay Up Late!
 2011 – Robot Zot!
 2011 – Scaredy Squirrel
 2011 – Too Many Toys
 2011 – The Little Old Lady Who Was Not Afraid of Anything
 2012 – Edwina, the Dinosaur Who Didn't Know She Was Extinct
 2012 – Knuffle Bunny Free: An Unexpected Diversion
 2012 – Hi! Fly Guy
 2012 – A Sick Day for Amos McGee
 2012 – Merry Christmas, Splat!
 2013 – I Want My Hat Back
 2013 – Hooray for Amanda and Her Alligator
 2013 – The Night Before Christmas
 2013 – The Ant and the Grasshopper
 2013 – My Garden
 2013 – And Then, It's Spring
 2013 – Creepy Carrots!
 2013 – Bear Has a Story to Tell
 2014 – Extra Yarn
 2014 – Exclamation Mark
 2014 – The Lucky Ducklings
 2014 – This is Not My Hat
 2015 – A House for Hermit Crab
 2015 - Bugs in My Hair!
 2015 – I'm Brave!
 2015 – Goldilocks and the Three Dinosaurs
 2015 – The Tiny Seed
 2015 – Peanut Butter and Jellyfish
 2016 – Groovy Joe: Ice Cream & Dinosaurs
 2016 – Abe's Honest Words
 2017 – Duck On a Tractor
 2017 – Mother Bruce
 2017 – Wolfie the Bunny
 2018 – Groovy Joe: Dance Party Countdown
 2018 – Sea Bones
 2018 – Nanette's Baguette
 2018 – Du Iz Tak?
 2019 – The Rooster Who Would Not Be Quiet!
 2019 – The Pigeon HAS to Go to School!
 2019 – Potato Pants!
 2020 – The Very Impatient Caterpillar
 2020 – Dog Breath: The Horrible Trouble with Hally Tosis
 2021 – Tiny T. Rex and the Impossible Hug
 2021 – Chicken Little: The Real and Totally True Tale
 2021 – If You Come to Earth
 2021 – We Are Water Protectors
 2021 – Be You!
 2022 – How Do Dinosaurs Say Goodbye?
 2022 – The Penguin Quartet
 2022 – Stop That Pickle!
 2022 – Smart, George
 2022 – Babe Ruth and the Ice Cream Mess
 2023 – Five Ugly Monsters
 2023 – There Was a Black Hole that Swallowed the Universe
 2023 – The Crazy Man
 2023 – Happy Birthday, Hamster
 2023 – The Honeybee and the Robber
 2023 – Love Monster
 2023 – Dinotrux
 2023 – Catch the Ball!

DVD releases
In 2002, a DVD collection of Weston Woods films entitled Scholastic Video Collection was released. Many compilations of Weston Woods films have been released under the title Scholastic Storybook Treasures.
 Where the Wild Things Are and Other Maurice Sendak Stories (Where the Wild Things Are; The Nutshell Kids; In the Night Kitchen) (2002)
 Chicka Chicka Boom Boom and Lots More Learning Fun (Chicka Chicka Boom Boom- 1999; Trashy Town- 2001; Rosie's Walk- 1970; The Caterpillar and the Polliwog- 1988; The Foolish Frog- 1971; Joey Runs Away- 1988; Changes, Changes- 1972) (2002)
 Chrysanthemum and More Kevin Henkes Stories (Chrysanthemum- 1999; Owen- 1995; A Weekend with Wendell- 1998; Picnic- 1991; Monty- 1992; The Wizard- 1985) (2002)
 The Night Before Christmas and More Christmas Stories (The Night Before Christmas- 1997; Max's Christmas- 1988; Morris' Disappearing Bag- 1982; Owl Moon- 1989; The Clown of God- 1982; Too Many Tamales- 2002) (2002)
 Click, Clack, Moo – Cows That Type and More Fun on the Farm (Click, Clack, Moo - Cows That Type- 2001; The Day Jimmy's Boa Ate the Wash- 1991; The Pigs' Wedding- 1990; The Cow Who Fell in the Canal- 1970; Charlie Needs a Cloak- 1977) (2003)
 Pete's a Pizza and More William Steig Stories (Pete's a Pizza- 2000; Doctor De Soto- 1984; The Amazing Bone- 1985; The Three Robbers- 1972; The Great White Man-Eating Shark- 1992; Moon Man- 1981) (2003)
 Harold and the Purple Crayon and More Harold Stories (Harold and the Purple Crayon- 1959; A Picture for Harold's Room- 1971; Harold's Fairy Tale- 1974; The Mysterious Tadpole- 1986; Drummer Hoff- 1969; Smile for Auntie- 1979) (2003)
 Miss Nelson Has a Field Day and Miss Nelson is Back (Miss Nelson Has a Field Day by Harry Allard, illustrated by James Marshall; Miss Nelson is Back by Harry Allard, illustrated by James Marshall; Panama by Janosch; The Three-Legged Cat by Margaret Mahy, illustrated by Jonathan Allen; The Bear and the Fly by Paula Winter) (2003)
 Red Riding Hood and More James Marshall Fairy Tale Favorites (Red Riding Hood- 1992; Goldilocks and the Three Bears- 1993; The Three Little Pigs- 1991; Chicken Little- 1998; Rapunzel- 2002) (2003)
 The Snowy Day and More Ezra Jack Keats Stories (The Snowy Day- 1964; Whistle for Willie- 1965; Peter's Chair- 1971; Pet Show!- 1992; A Letter to Amy- 1970; The Trip- 1981; Apt. 3- 1977) (2003)
 Good Night, Gorilla and More Bedtime Stories (Good Night, Gorilla- 1998; How Do Dinosaurs Say Good Night?- 2002; Happy Birthday, Moon- 1985; The Napping House- 1985; The Paperboy- 2000; Patrick- 1973; The Hat- 1982) (2003)
 Harry the Dirty Dog and More Terrific Tails (Harry the Dirty Dog- 1997; Officer Buckle and Gloria- 1997; Angus and the Ducks- 1998; The Beast of Monsieur Racine- 1974; Fourteen Rats and a Rat-Catcher- 1982; John Brown, Rose, and the Midnight Cat- 1982) (2003)
 Is Your Mama a Llama? and More Stories About Growing Up (Is Your Mama a Llama?- 2001; Leo the Late Bloomer- 1999; Elizabeti's Doll- 2000; Goose- 2002; Five Creatures- 2002) (2004)
 Corduroy and More Stories About Friendship (Corduroy by Don Freeman; Yo! Yes? by Chris Raschka; Here Comes the Cat! by Frank Asch, illustrated by Vladimir Vagin; The Rainbabies by Laura Krauss Melmed, illustrated by Jim LaMarche) (2004)
 The Scrambled States of America and More Stories to Celebrate Our Country (The Scrambled States of America by Laurie Keller; This Land Is Your Land illustrated by Kathy Jakobsen; The Star-Spangled Banner illustrated by Peter Spier; John Henry by Julius Lester, illustrated by Jerry Pinkney; Johnny Appleseed by Reeve Lindbergh, illustrated by Kathy Jakobsen) (2004)
 Make Way for Ducklings and More Robert McCloskey Stories (Make Way for Ducklings- 1955; Blueberries for Sal- 1967; Time of Wonder- 1961; Burt Dow: Deep-Water Man- 1983; Lentil- 1957) (2004)
 Strega Nona and More Caldecott Award-Winning Folk Tales (Strega Nona by Tomie de Paola; Joseph Had a Little Overcoat by Simms Taback; Stone Soup by Marcia Brown; The Tale of the Mandarin Ducks by Katherine Paterson, illustrated by Leo and Diane Dillon) (2004)
 There Was an Old Lady Who Swallowed a Fly and More Stories That Sing (There Was an Old Lady Who Swallowed a Fly by Simms Taback; Antarctic Antics by Judy Sierra, illustrated by Jose Aruego and Ariane Dewey; Musical Max by Robert Kraus, illustrated by Jose Aruego and Ariane Dewey; Keeping House by Margaret Mahy, illustrated by Wendy Smith; Waiting for Wings by Lois Ehlert) (2004)
 Curious George Rides a Bike and More Tales of Mischief (Curious George Rides a Bike- 1958; The Great White Man-Eating Shark- 1992; Flossie and the Fox- 1991; The Happy Lion- 1990; Cat and Canary- 1994) (2004)
 Why Mosquitoes Buzz in People's Ears and More Stories from Africa (Why Mosquitoes Buzz in People's Ears- 1984; A Story, A Story- 1973; Who's in Rabbit's House?- 1995; The Village of Round and Square Houses- 1986; Hot Hippo- 1989) (2004)
 The Teacher from the Black Lagoon and More Slightly Scary Stories (The Teacher from the Black Lagoon- 2003; What's Under My Bed?- 1989; By the Light of the Halloween Moon- 1997; The Three Robbers- 1972; A Dark, Dark Tale- 1983; Georgie- 1956; Teeny-Tiny and the Witch-Woman- 1980) (2004)
 Giggle, Giggle, Quack and More Funny Favorites (Giggle, Giggle, Quack- 2003; The Most Wonderful Egg in the World- 1986; Wings: A Tale of Two Chickens- 1991; The Foolish Frog- 1971; Picnic- 1991; The Three-Legged Cat- 1994) (2004)
 How Do Dinosaurs Say Good Night? and More Stories That Rhyme (How Do Dinosaurs Say Good Night?- 2002; In the Small, Small Pond- 2001; Zin! Zin! Zin! A Violin- 1999; All the Colors of the Earth- 1997; The Napping House- 1985; Joey Runs Away- 1988; Picnic- 1991) (2004)
 Bark, George and More Doggie Tails (Bark, George by Jules Feiffer; Dot the Fire Dog by Lisa Desimini; No Roses for Harry by Gene Zion, illustrated by Margaret Bloy Graham; A Boy, A Dog, and A Frog by Mercer Mayer; Whistle for Willie by Ezra Jack Keats; Angus Lost by Marjorie Flack) (2004)
 Swimmy and More Classic Leo Lionni Stories (Swimmy- 1986; Frederick- 1986; Fish is Fish- 1986; It's Mine!- 1986; Cornelius- 1986; Each Peach, Pear, Plum- 1992; Hush, Little Baby- 1970; Let's Give Kitty a Bath!- 1985) (2005)
 The Emperor's New Clothes and More Hans Christian Andersen Fairy Tales (The Emperor's New Clothes; The Ugly Duckling; The Swineherd; The Nightingale) (2005)
 Sylvester and the Magic Pebble and More Magical Tales (Sylvester and the Magic Pebble- 1993; Possum Magic- 2001; Princess Furball- 1993; The Wizard- 1985) (2005)
 The Day Jimmy's Boa Ate the Wash and More Back-to-School Stories (The Day Jimmy's Boa Ate the Wash by Trinka Hakes Noble, illustrated by Steven Kellogg; Shrinking Violet by Cari Best, illustrated by Giselle Potter; Will I Have a Friend? by Miriam Cohen, illustrated by Lillian Hoban; The Sweater by Roch Carrier, illustrated by Sheldon Cohen; Many Moons by James Thurber, illustrated by Louis Slobodkin) (2005)
 Tikki Tikki Tembo and More Favorite Tales (Tikki Tikki Tembo by Arlene Mosel, illustrated by Blair Lent; Hot Hippo by Mwenye Hadithi, illustrated by Adrienne Kennaway; The Tender Tale of Cinderella Penguin by Janet Perlman; The Happy Lion by Louise Fatio, illustrated by Roger Duvoisin; The Magic of Anansi by Sugith Varughese; Little Red Riding Hood by Rhoda Leyer) (2005)
 Danny and the Dinosaur and More Friendly "Monster" Stories (Danny and the Dinosaur- 1990; The Island of the Skog- 1999; The Beast of Monsieur Racine- 1974; Here Comes the Cat!- 1992; Stanley and the Dinosaurs- 1988) (2005)
 Bear Snores On and More Beary Adorable Tales (Bear Snores On- 2005; Henry Hikes to Fitchburg- 2001; Bear Wants More- 2006; Goldilocks and the Three Bears- 1993; Panama- 1982; The Bear and the Fly- 1985) (2005)
 The Wheels on the Bus and More Sing-Along Favorites (The Wheels on the Bus by Paul O. Zelinsky; Dem Bones illustrated by Bob Barner; Over in the Meadow by John Langstaff, illustrated by Feodor Rojankovsky; I Know an Old Lady Who Swallowed a Fly by Rose Bonne and Alan Mills; I Want a Dog by Dayal Kaur Khalsa; The Chinese Violin by Madeleine Thien, illustrated by Joe Chang) (2005)
 The Dot and More Stories to Make You Feel Good (The Dot- 2004; Amazing Grace- 1994; Brave Irene- 1989; Flossie and the Fox- 1991) (2005)
 Martin's Big Words and More Stories from the African-American Tradition (Martin's Big Words- 2001; John Henry- 1998; Seven Candles for Kwanzaa- 1997; Ella Fitzgerald: The Tale of a Vocal Virtuosa- 2003; Duke Ellington: The Piano Prince and His Orchestra- 2000) (2005)
 Bear Snores On and More Stories to Celebrate the Seasons (Bear Snores On by Karma Wilson, illustrated by Jane Chapman; Waiting for Wings by Lois Ehlert; Come On, Rain! by Karen Hesse, illustrated by Jon J. Muth; Snow Cat by Dayal Kaur Khalsa; Time of Wonder by Robert McCloskey) (2005)
 I Love You Like Crazy Cakes and More Stories About Families (I Love You Like Crazy Cakes by Rose Lewis, illustrated by Jane Dyer; Three Cheers for Catherine the Great! by Cari Best, illustrated by Giselle Potter; Five Creatures by Emily Jenkins, illustrated by Tomek Bogacki; Uncle Elephant by Arnold Lobel) (2006)
 Chicka Chicka 123 and More Stories About Counting (Chicka Chicka 123- 2004; How Much is a Million?- 2000; If You Made a Million- 2002; Millions of Cats- 1955) (2006)
 Mike Mulligan and His Steam Shovel and 3 More Stories about Trucks (Mike Mulligan and His Steam Shovel by Virginia Lee Burton; I Stink! by Kate and Jim McMullan; Trashy Town by Andrea Zimmerman and David Clemesha, illustrated by Dan Yaccarino; Dot the Fire Dog by Lisa Desimini; The Remarkable Riderless Runaway Tricycle by Bruce McMillan) (2006)
 The Man Who Walked Between the Towers and More Inspiring Tales (The Man Who Walked Between the Towers- 2005; Snowflake Bentley- 2003; Miss Rumphius- 2000; The Pot that Juan Built- 2004) (2006)
 The Little Drummer Boy and 4 More Holiday Stories (The Little Drummer Boy- 1968; Merry Christmas, Space Case- 2002; Sam and the Lucky Money- 1999; The Tomten- 1982; The Twelve Days of Christmas- 1971) (2006)
 Teeny-Tiny and the Witch-Woman and 4 More Spine-Tingling Tales (Teeny-Tiny and the Witch-Woman- 1980; Space Case- 2000; The Boy with Two Shadows- 1994; The Witch in the Cherry Tree- 1994; King of the Cats- 1984) (2006)
 James Marshall’s Cinderella and More Beloved Fairy Tales (Cinderella- 2006; Hansel and Gretel- 2005; The Three Billy Goats Gruff- 1991; The Elves and the Shoemaker- 2004; The Fisherman and His Wife- 1993) (2007)
 Open Wide: Tooth School Inside and 4 More Fantastic Children’s Stories (Open Wide: Tooth School Inside by Laurie Keller; How Do Dinosaurs Get Well Soon? by Jane Yolen, illustrated by Mark Teague; Wilfrid Gordon McDonald Partridge by Mem Fox, illustrated by Julie Vivas; Doctor De Soto by William Steig; Joey Runs Away by Jack Kent) (2007) 
 Beverly Clearly’s Ralph S. Mouse and More Exciting Animal Adventure Stories! (Ralph S. Mouse by Beverly Cleary, illustrated by Paul O. Zelinsky; Stanley and the Dinosaurs by Syd Hoff; Uncle Elephant by Arnold Lobel) (2007)
 Diary of a Worm and 4 More Great Animal Tales (Diary of a Worm by Doreen Cronin, illustrated by Harry Bliss; Anatole by Eve Titus, illustrated by Paul Galdone; Frog Goes to Dinner by Mercer Mayer; I Lost My Bear by Jules Feiffer; The Three-Legged Cat by Margaret Mahy, illustrated by Jonathan Allen) (2007)
 Arnie the Doughnut and 4 Other Fantastic Adventure Stories (Arnie the Doughnut- 2005; Roberto the Insect Architect- 2005; Hondo and Fabian- 2006; That New Animal- 2006; Swamp Angel- 2001) (2007)
 Noisy Nora and More Stories About Mischief (Noisy Nora- 1994; T is for Terrible- 2005; Cannonball- 1984; Goggles!- 1974; Munro- 1960) (2007)
 Emily's First 100 Days of School and More Great School Time Stories (Emily's First 100 Days of School by Rosemary Wells; Reading to Your Bunny by Rosemary Wells; If You Made a Million by David M. Schwartz, illustrated by Steven Kellogg) (2007)

HBO Max
In 2021, the company's Mo Willems book adaptations were released on Warner Bros. Discovery's SVOD service HBO Max. Mo Willems' Storytime Shorts! include all 14 of the company's Mo Willems book cartoons.

See also

 Reading Rainbow
 Michael Sporn

References

External links
 
 
 Weston Woods on BCDB.com

American animation studios
1953 establishments in Connecticut
1996 mergers and acquisitions
Entertainment companies established in 1953
Film production companies of the United States
Companies based in Norwalk, Connecticut
Scholastic Corporation